Dimitar Blagov (born 30 March 1992) is a Bulgarian footballer currently playing as a midfielder for Septemvri Simitli.

Career
Blagov joined Pirin Blagoevgrad in January 2013.

References

External links
 Player Profile at Sportal.bg
 
 

1992 births
Living people
Bulgarian footballers
First Professional Football League (Bulgaria) players
Association football midfielders
FC Pomorie players
Neftochimic Burgas players
OFC Pirin Blagoevgrad players
FC Strumska Slava Radomir players
FC Septemvri Simitli players
Sportspeople from Blagoevgrad